Caecoonops is a genus of spiders in the family Oonopidae. It was first described in 1964 by Benoit. , it contains 2 species.

References

Oonopidae
Araneomorphae genera
Spiders of Africa